Urala is a rural locality (a selo) in Tlogobsky Selsoviet, Gunibsky District, Republic of Dagestan, Russia. The population was 61 as of 2010.

Geography 
Urala is located 44 km northwest of Gunib (the district's administrative centre) by road, on the Kunada River. Bolshoy Urala and Maly Urala are the nearest rural localities.

Nationalities 
Avars live there.

References 

Rural localities in Gunibsky District